Charles Karsner Mills, M.D. (1845–1930), an American physician and an eminent neurologist, was called the dean of American neurology.

Mills was born in Philadelphia, Pennsylvania.  He graduated from high school in Philadelphia then joined the Union Army during the American Civil War.  He entered the medical department of the University of Pennsylvania and received his medical degree in 1869 and a Ph.D. in 1871.  In 1916, the University of Pennsylvania awarded him an honorary LLD when he became Emeritus professor of neurology.

Mills practiced general medicine for ten years and after 1880, he devoted his practice to nervous and mental diseases.  He was appointed as a physician to the medical dispensary of the Protestant Episcopal Hospital in Philadelphia.

Mills was affiliated with many hospitals in the Philadelphia area as an attending physician or as a consultant.  He held various teaching positions at the medical institutions in Philadelphia.  He was professor of Nervous and Mental Diseases at the Philadelphia Polyclinic from 1883 to 1898; clinical Professor of Nervous Diseases at the Woman's Medical College of Pennsylvania from 1889 to 1902; and lecturer on electrotherapeutics and clinical Professor of Nervous Diseases at the medical school of the University of Pennsylvania in 1872.  He was interested in developing post graduate teaching at the Philadelphia Polyclinic.  In 1914, he helped to organize the Philadelphia Post-graduate School of Neurology, and became a clinical professor in 1919.  During World War I, he organized and taught neurology to medical officers.

Mills held numerous positions in scientific and medical associations.  He was President of the Northern Medical Association of Philadelphia in 1876; and president of the Philadelphia Neurological Society for the years 1893, 1896, and 1914.  He founded the Philadelphia County Medical Society in 1906.  He was President of the American Neurological Association in 1886 and 1924.  He was a member of the American Medico Psychological Association, the College of Physicians of Philadelphia, the History Society, and the Academy of Natural Sciences of Philadelphia.

Mills published a textbook on the nervous system and its diseases in 1908.  His bibliography includes over 250 journal articles.  Many of his articles include case descriptions with autopsies and pathological findings.  He gained three entries in Garrison and Morton’s Medical Bibliography describing for the first time a case of ascending paralysis in 1900, and a case of descending paralysis in 1906. He is interred at Laurel Hill Cemetery in Philadelphia. 
He died in 1930.

Works

Mills, Charles K.  “Benjamin Rush and American Psychiatry,” The Medico-Legal Journal 4(3) (Dec. 8, 1886): 238-273.

Mills, Charles K.  The Nervous System and its Diseases: A Practical Treatise on Neurology for the use of Physicians and Students.  Philadelphia: J.B. Lippincott Co., 1898.   https://archive.org/details/cu31924104225093

Mills, Charles K.  “Aphasia and the Cerebral Zone of Speech,” American Journal of the Medical-Sciences 127 (Jan. 1904): 275-392.

Mills, Charles K.  The Nursing and Care of the Nervous and the Insane.  Philadelphia: Lippincott, 1905. https://archive.org/details/39002010916162.med.yale.edu

Mills, Charles K.  Tumors of the Cerebellum.  New York: Elliott, 1905.   https://archive.org/details/tumorsofcerebell00mill

Mills, Charles K.  “Psychotherapy: Its Scope and Limitations,” Monthly Cyclopaedia and Medical Bulletin (July 1908).

Mills, Charles K.  “Concerning Cerebral Morphology in its Relation to Cerebral Localization,” Journal of Nervous & Mental Disease 42(6) (June 1915): 322-357.

References

Semi-Centennial Anniversary Volume, 1874-1924. American Neurological Association.  Edited by Frederick Tilney and Smith E. Jelliffe.    [Albany, NY], 1924.

Denny-Brown, Derek, ed., et al.  Centennial Anniversary Volume of the American Neurological Association, 1875-1975.  New York: Springer, 1975.

Norman, Jeremy M.  Morton’s Medical Bibliography: An Annotated Checklist of Texts Illustrating the History of Medicine.  Aldershot, Hants, England: Scholar Press; Brookfield, VT: Gower Pub. Co., 1991.

1845 births
1930 deaths
American neurologists
Burials at Laurel Hill Cemetery (Philadelphia)
Physicians from Philadelphia
People of Pennsylvania in the American Civil War
Perelman School of Medicine at the University of Pennsylvania alumni
University of Pennsylvania faculty